Falk Henning Wendrich (born 12 June 1995) is a German high jumper.

Wendrich won a silver medal at the high jump at the 2012 World Junior Championships in Athletics in Barcelona. and finished fifth at the 2014 edition. He won gold at the 2017 Summer Universiade, clearing a new personal best 2.29 meters.

In 2019, he won the bronze medal in the team event at the 2019 European Games held in Minsk, Belarus.

References

1995 births
Living people
German male high jumpers
Universiade medalists in athletics (track and field)
Universiade gold medalists for Germany
Athletes (track and field) at the 2019 European Games
European Games medalists in athletics
European Games bronze medalists for Germany
Medalists at the 2017 Summer Universiade